Phasmahyla is a genus of tree frogs. They are commonly known as shining leaf frogs.

Species 
The following species are recognised in the genus Phasmahyla:

References

 
Phyllomedusinae
Amphibian genera